Tao Hong may refer to:

Tao Hong (actress, born 1969), Chinese actress
Tao Hong (actress, born 1972), Chinese actress and synchronised swimmer

See also
Taohong, a town in Longhui County, Hunan, China